The National Order of José Matías Delgado is a distinction granted by the Republic of El Salvador to Heads of State, Salvadoran citizens, or foreigners who are distinguished by eminent services to the country through extraordinary civil virtues which are humanitarian, scientific, literary, artistic, political, or military. The President of El Salvador is the Grand Master of the Order.

Design 

The order is named after José Matías Delgado, a Salvadoran priest and doctor known as The Father of the Salvadoran Fatherland who lived from 1767 to 1832. He was a leader in the independence movement of El Salvador from Spain and then later Mexico.

Grades 

The order is awarded in 6 classes:

Grand Cross with Gold Star and Special Distinction
Grand Cross with Gold Star
Grand Cross with Silver Star
Grand Officer
Commander
Knight

Recipients 

 Eduardo Aguirre
 Prudencia Ayala †
 Ban Ki-moon
 Rafael Barrientos
 Irina Bokova
 Felipe Calderón
 Camilo José Cela †
 Felipe VI
 José Mejía Vides
 Fredrick Chien
 Raúl Contreras
 Infanta Cristiana
 Maria Esperanza lara de Flores
 José María Figueres
 Reynaldo Galindo Pohl
 José Gustavo Guerrero
 Michael D. Higgins
 Tsai Ing-wen
 Juan Carlos I
 Claudia Lars
 Valero Lecha
 Mercedes Madriz de Altamirano
 Golda Meir
 Eduardo Montealegre
 Augusto Pinochet
 Fernando Sáenz Lacalle
 Rainier III
 Toño Salazar
 Julio María Sanguinetti
 Juan Manuel Santos
 Queen Sofía
 Jürgen Steinkrüger
 Miguel Ydígoras Fuentes
 8 Jesuit martyrs †

† - posthumous

See also 

José Matías Delgado

References 

Orders, decorations, and medals of El Salvador
Awards established in 1946
1946 establishments in El Salvador